Seongju Hwang clan is a Korean clas. Their Bon-gwan is in Seongju County, North Gyeongsang Province. Hwang Rak, a minister of the Han dynasty, began the Hwang clan in Korea after he was cast ashore when traveling to Vietnam in 28 CE and then naturalized in Silla.

See also 
 Korean clan names of foreign origin

References

External links 
 

 
Korean clan names of Chinese origin
Hwang clans